Publius Septimius Geta (c. 143 - c. 203/c. 204) was the second son to the elder Publius Septimius Geta and brother of the emperor Septimius Severus. His mother was Fulvia Pia. He was born and raised in Leptis Magna (southeast of Carthage, modern Libya, North Africa). He had Italian Roman ancestry on his mother's side, and was descended from Punic forebears on his father's side.

This Geta was more politically active than his father. Geta was appointed one of the decemviri stlitibus judicandis, which in part involved judging lawsuits. These ten men were one of the four boards that form the vigintiviri; membership in one of these four boards was a preliminary and required first step toward a gaining entry into the Roman Senate. After this Geta was commissioned a tribunus laticlavius with the Legio II Augusta, at the time stationed in Roman Britain. This was followed by the office of aedile cerealis, a Curator rei pub. Anconitanorum and a Praet. hastarius et tutel. Geta in 185 became legatus legionis or commander of Legio I Italica and afterwards a Proconsul of Sicily around 187/8. Between circa 188 and circa 190, he became legatus of Lusitania. He was suffect consul in or around 191.

After his suffect consulship, between 193 and 194, he became Legatus of Moesia Inferior. When Severus was proclaimed emperor in 193, Geta led the legions to Carnuntum, where his brother was, to show his support. He is attested as being the Legatus for Tres Daciae in 195. Geta was appointed as Quaestor and Praetor of Crete and Cyrenaica and became one of the Consuls in 203. Geta died around 203 or 204. On his deathbed, Geta stated to Severus that he hated the Praetorian Prefect, Gaius Fulvius Plautianus, and warned him of Plautianus' treachery.

Severan family tree

References 

 https://web.archive.org/web/20070908142242/http://www.ancientlibrary.com/smith-bio/1375.html

Geta, Publius Septimius
Imperial Roman consuls
Roman governors of Sicily
Roman governors of Lusitania
Roman governors of Lower Moesia
Roman governors of Dacia
2nd-century Romans
3rd-century Romans
2nd-century Punic people
3rd-century Punic people
140s births
200s deaths
Year of birth uncertain
Year of death uncertain
Family of Septimius Severus